The  Asian Men's Volleyball Championship was the tenth staging of the Asian Men's Volleyball Championship, a biennial international volleyball tournament organised by the Asian Volleyball Confederation (AVC) with Islamic Republic of Iran Volleyball Federation (IRIVF). The tournament was held in Tehran, Iran from 2 to 9 September 1999.

Venues

Pools composition
The teams are seeded based on their final ranking at the 1997 Asian Men's Volleyball Championship.

Preliminary round

Pool A

|}

|}

Pool B

|}

|}

Pool C

|}

|}

Pool D

|}

|}

Quarterfinals 
 The results and the points of the matches between the same teams that were already played during the preliminary round shall be taken into account for the Quarterfinals.

Pool E

|}

|}

Pool F

|}

|}

Pool G

|}

|}

Pool H

|}

|}

Final round
 The results and the points of the matches between the same teams that were already played during the previous rounds shall be taken into account for the final round.

Classification 13th–14th 

|}

|}

Classification 9th–12th 

|}

|}

Classification 5th–8th 

|}

|}

Championship

|}

|}

Final standing

Awards
MVP:  Behnam Mahmoudi
Best Scorer:  Benjamin Hardy
Best Spiker:  Benjamin Hardy
Best Blocker:  Kim Se-jin
Best Server:  Zhu Gang
Best Setter:  Zhou Jianan
Best Digger:  Koichi Nishimura
Best Receiver:  Li Tieming

References
JVA (Archived 2009-05-13)
Results

A
V
Asian men's volleyball championships
International volleyball competitions hosted by Iran